Oleg Yuryevich Siniavin (born 8 July 1995) is a Russian sprint canoeist.

He won a medal at the 2019 ICF Canoe Sprint World Championships.

References

External links
 Oleg Siniavin at the Russian Canoe Federation

1995 births
Living people
ICF Canoe Sprint World Championships medalists in kayak
Russian male canoeists